Theuville-aux-Maillots is a commune in the Seine-Maritime department in the Normandy region in north-western France.

Geography

Heraldry

Population

Places of interest
 The church of St. Maclou and St. Eutrope, dating from the eighteenth century.
 A chateau dating from the sixteenth century.

See also
Communes of the Seine-Maritime department

References

Communes of Seine-Maritime